SOCRATES or Space Optical Communications Research Advanced Technology Satellite is a Japanese micro-satellite launched in 2014. The satellite is purely a technology demonstrator designed by NICT intended to help AES company to gain experience in basic mission control, attitude control and spacecraft communications. Its main experiment is SOTA (Small Optical TrAnsponder), an optical small satellite communications demonstrator.
All subsystems of spacecraft are powered by solar cells mounted on spacecraft body and stub wings, with estimated electrical power of  120W BOL degrading to 100W EOL.

SOTA was the first lasercom on board a microsatellite, performing a variety of experiments in a less-than-6 kg compact package, being the main one the 10 Mbit/s links at 1549 nm using coarse and fine-pointing to accurately transmit the 35-mW laser through a 5-cm Cassegrain telescope. SOTA had other additional capabilities, i.e. B92-like QKD protocol at 800-nm band to perform the first-time quantum-limited demonstration from space.

Launch
SOCRATES was launched from Tanegashima, Japan, on 24 May 2014 at 03:05:00 UTC by an H-IIA 202.

See also

 2014 in spaceflight

References

External links
 SOCRATES construction overview

Earth observation satellites of Japan
Spacecraft launched by H-II rockets
Spacecraft launched in 2014